Tudora is a commune in Botoșani County, Western Moldavia, Romania. It is composed of a single village, Tudora.

References

Communes in Botoșani County
Localities in Western Moldavia